Strephonota tephraeus is a species of butterfly of the family Lycaenidae. It is found from Mexico to Venezuela, the Amazon, the Guianas and Peru. Rare strays can be found as far north as the lower Rio Grande Valley in Texas. The habitat consists of lowland tropical forests, particularly along rivers.

The wingspan is 22–29 mm. The upperside of the males is iridescent blue with a black forewing apex and a large oval black and brown patch in the cell. Females are duller blue with a blackish forewing apex. The underside is pale gray with white streaks barely visible against the background. Adults are on wing from May to December in Mexico in multiple generations per year. Adults have been recorded in November in southern Texas. Adults presumably feed on flower nectar.

References

Butterflies described in 1837
Theclinae
Lycaenidae of South America
Taxa named by Carl Geyer